Aleksandr Vasilyev may refer to:

 Aleksandr Vasilyev (hurdler) (born 1961), Soviet-Belarusian hurdler
 Aleksandr Vasilyev (runner), Russian long-distance runner at the 2004 IAAF World Half Marathon Championships
 Aleksandr Borisovich Vasilyev (born 1990), Russian footballer with FC Mordovia Saransk
 Aleksandr Nikolayevich Vasilyev (footballer, born 1980), Russian footballer with FC Luch-Energiya Vladivostok 
 Aleksandr Nikolayevich Vasilyev (footballer, born 1992), Russian footballer with PFC CSKA Moscow
 Aleksandr Vasilyev (footballer, born 2000), Russian footballer

See also
Alexander Vasilyev (disambiguation)
Alexey Vasilyev (disambiguation)
Aleksandar Vasilev (disambiguation)